Quarles is a hamlet and former civil parish, now in the civil parish of Holkham, in the North Norfolk district, in the county of Norfolk, England. The nearest railway station is Sheringham for the Bittern Line which runs between Sheringham, Cromer and Norwich. The nearest airport is Norwich International Airport. The hamlet is just south of the Holkham Estate and consists of six houses and one farm. In 1931 the civil parish had a population of 38.

History
The name Quarles originates from the name Huerueles  which is old English for the place of hwerfel The name is thought to originally referred to a prehistoric stone circle which was thought to be near-by although no trace of any such feature remains today.

Quarles has an entry in the Domesday Book of 1085. In the great book Quarles is recorded by the names Gueruelei, and Huerueles. The manor is Kings Land and the main landholders being Roger Bigot, with his main tenant being Thurston Fitzguy.

Quarles was formerly an extra-parochial tract, from 1858 Quarles was a civil parish in its own right, on 1 April 1935 the parish was abolished and merged with Great Walsingham, it was transferred to Holkham in 1947.

References

Hamlets in Norfolk
Former civil parishes in Norfolk
North Norfolk